Aleksei Vladislavovich Melyoshin (born 30 January 1976) is a Russian football coach and a former player.

Personal life
His son Pavel Melyoshin is a professional footballer.

Achievements
 Russian Premier League winner: 1996, 1997, 1998, 1999.
 Russian Second Division, Zone West best midfielder: 2009.

References

External links
 

1976 births
People from Shchyolkovsky District
Living people
Russian footballers
Association football midfielders
Association football forwards
FC Dynamo Saint Petersburg players
FC Moscow players
FC Saturn Ramenskoye players
FC Spartak Moscow players
Russian Premier League players
FC Spartak-2 Moscow players
Sportspeople from Moscow Oblast